Justin Reis Baughman (born August 1, 1974) is an American former professional baseball player who played two seasons for the Anaheim Angels of Major League Baseball (MLB).

Baughman attended Lewis & Clark College, graduating in 2001 with a B.S. in business.  Baughman was head coach of Lewis & Clark College's varsity baseball team from the fall of 2005 until early January 2010, when he resigned to take a job as the Northwest area scout for the San Diego Padres.

External links

 bio

1974 births
Living people
Anaheim Angels players
Cedar Rapids Kernels players
Charlotte Knights players
Baseball managers
Baseball coaches from California
Baseball players from San Jose, California
Boise Hawks players
Edmonton Trappers players
Erie SeaWolves players
Lake Elsinore Storm players
Lewis & Clark Pioneers baseball players
Major League Baseball second basemen
Salt Lake Stingers players
San Diego Padres scouts
Vancouver Canadians players
Bellarmine College Preparatory alumni